Thunder River may refer to:
 Thunder River (Peshtigo River tributary), a tributary in Wisconsin, US
 Thunder River (Tapeats Creek tributary), a tributary in the Grand Canyon, Arizona
 Thunder River Rapids Ride, an amusement ride at Dreamworld
 Thunder River (ride), amusement rides at Six Flags Astroworld, Six Flags Over Georgia, and Six Flags St. Louis
 Thunder River Trail, a hiking trail in Arizona, US